Crook City (also known as Camp Crook II or simply Crook) is a populated place in Lawrence County, South Dakota, United States. The population was 132 at the 2020 census. It became a census-designated place prior to the 2020 census.

Crook City was named for General George Crook's 1876 camp there. Nearby and between Deadwood and Sturgis is Crook Mountain, also named for him.

See also 
Whitewood, South Dakota

References 

Geography of Lawrence County, South Dakota
Census-designated places in Lawrence County, South Dakota
Census-designated places in South Dakota